The Royal Air Force Club, or RAF Club in short-form, is a club located at 128 Piccadilly, London.  

Membership is open to men and women who hold, or have held, commissions in the RAF, PMRAFNS, Reserve Forces and Commonwealth and friendly foreign air forces.  The Chairman is Air Marshal Dame Sue Gray CB, OBE, RAF.

History
The Royal Flying Corps Club, the forerunner of the Royal Air Force Club, opened at 13 Bruton Street in 1917. It became the Royal Air Force Club in 1918 shortly after the first Lord Cowdray donated funds to obtain a permanent building which would house the Club. The buildings, still in use today, were acquired by the middle of 1919 (the Piccadilly frontage was originally the Ladies Lyceum Club, while the rear half, facing Old Park Lane, was stables). Between 1919 and 1921 extensive reconstruction took place supervised by architect Maurice Webb and largely financed by Lord Cowdray. On 2 January 1922 the Club was fully opened to Members although it was not officially opened by the Duke of York until 24 February 1922. On 12 March 1922 the Club was visited by King George V and Queen Mary. This association with the Royal Family continues to this day, Queen Elizabeth II being the Club's Patron.

As of 2017, a year's membership subscription costs half of one day's wages for serving (from £42.50), or former serving (retired) RAF officers (£155.00). For non-RAF personnel, affiliate membership starts at £170 plus joining fee. Non-RAF personnel who are eligible to apply for membership include those in the aerospace industry who are Fellows of the Royal Aeronautical Society (FRAeS).

References

Bibliography
 Henry Probert & Michael Gilbert, 128: The Story of the Royal Air Force Club, Royal Air Force Club, 2004.

External links
 RAF Club website

Gentlemen's clubs in London
Royal Air Force
1918 establishments in the United Kingdom
Grade II listed buildings in the City of Westminster
Piccadilly
Military gentlemen's clubs